Bill Brown IV (born 1969) is an American composer known for creating music for several video games and films. He is best known for his work on Microsoft's Windows XP operating system, composing the system sounds as well as music for the tour software. His father was renowned New York City radio disc jockey, Bill Brown (III) (d. 2011).

Awards
BMI 2005 TV Music Award for "CSI: NY" Season 1
ITVA Golden Reel GOLD Award for Kennedy Space Center "Gateway to the Universe" soundtrack
Music4Games – M4G Editor's Choice Award for "The Sum of All Fears" (PC)
Best Music Award – PCXL Magazine's 1998 All-Star Awards for "Tom Clancy's Rainbow Six"

Nominations
Game Audio Network Guild (G.A.N.G.) 2003 Awards Nominee for Lineage II: the Chaotic Chronicle (NCSoft), in the following categories: Best Live Performance Recording, Best Cinematic / Cut-Scene Audio, Best Original Vocal Song – Choral
British Academy of Film and Television Arts (BAFTA) 2003 Games Awards Nominee in the Music category: Return to Castle Wolfenstein: Tides of War
British Academy of Film and Television Arts (BAFTA) 2003 Games Awards Nominee in the Music category: Command and Conquer: Generals
Golden Reel Nominee: Feature Film Ali (Columbia Pictures/Sony Pictures Entertainment)
Golden Reel Nominee: Feature Film Any Given Sunday (Warner Bros.)
British Academy of Film and Television Arts (BAFTA) 2001 Interactive Entertainment Award Nominee in the Music category: "Clive Barker's Undying"
Best Original Music Nominee by L.A. Weekly: Blue Sphere Alliance's live theatrical production "Nagasaki Dust"
Golden Reel Nominee: Hercules: The Legendary Journeys (Renaissance Pictures/Universal)
Golden Reel Nominee: In the Presence of Mine Enemies (Showtime Pictures)

Discography

Video games

Quake II (1997)
Trespasser (1998)
Tom Clancy's Rainbow Six (1998)
Tom Clancy's Rainbow Six: Rogue Spear (1999)
Disney's Villains' Revenge (1999)
Quake III (1999)
Timeline (2000)
Shadow Watch (2000)
Return to Castle Wolfenstein (2001)
Clive Barker's Undying (2001)
Anachronox (2001)
Tom Clancy's Ghost Recon (2001)
Tom Clancy's Rainbow Six: Black Thorn (2001)
The Sum of All Fears (2002)
Tom Clancy's Ghost Recon: Island Thunder (2002)
Tom Clancy's Ghost Recon 2 (2004) – theme co-written with Tom Salta
Command & Conquer: Generals (2003)
Command & Conquer: Generals Zero Hour (2003)
Lineage II: The Chaotic Chronicle (2003)
Tom Clancy's Rainbow Six 3: Raven Shield (2003)
Wolfenstein: Enemy Territory (2003)
Tom Clancy's Ghost Recon: Jungle Storm (2004)
Tom Clancy's Rainbow Six: Lockdown (2005)
The Incredible Hulk: Ultimate Destruction (2005)
Command & Conquer: The First Decade (2006) – compilation which included his work
Tom Clancy's Rainbow Six: Critical Hour (2006)
Enemy Territory: Quake Wars (2007)
Wolfenstein (2009)
Captain America: Super Soldier (2011)

Film
War of the Angels (1999)
Any Given Sunday (1999) (songs "Sharks' Theme", "Spiritual" and "Rock the Sharks")
Ali (2001) (songs "Round 8 Strings" and "Prequel Strings")
Behind Enemy Lines: The Making of Return to Castle Wolfenstein (2001)
Scorcher (2002)
Evil Deeds (2004)
Lady Death (2004)
The Devil's Tomb (2009)
Rushlights (2013)
Negative (2017)
Duke (2019)
Infamous (2020)

Television
Trapped (2001, TV film)
CSI: NY (2004–2013, TV series)
Whodunnit? (2013, TV series)

Other
Windows XP (2001)
Dreamstate (2018)

References

Further reading
Bill Brown biography

External links
Official website

Artist profile at OverClocked ReMix

1969 births
Living people
American film score composers
American male film score composers
Musicians from San Diego
Video game composers